The 1984 California Golden Bears football team was an American football team that represented the University of California, Berkeley in the Pacific-10 Conference (Pac-10) during the 1984 NCAA Division I-A football season. In their fourth year under head coach Joe Kapp, the Golden Bears compiled a 2–9 record (1–8 against Pac-10 opponents), finished in last place in the Pac-10, and were outscored by their opponents by a combined total of 264 to 150.

The team's statistical leaders included Gale Gilbert with 1,693 passing yards, Ed Barbero with 554 rushing yards, and Rance McDougald with 473 receiving yards.

Schedule

Roster

References

California
California Golden Bears football seasons
California Golden Bears football